Zion Grove is an unincorporated community in Schuylkill County, Pennsylvania, United States. Zion Grove has a post office, with ZIP code 17985, which opened on September 21, 1868.

References

Unincorporated communities in Schuylkill County, Pennsylvania
Unincorporated communities in Pennsylvania